Ceyu is a town of Jingxing County in the Taihang Mountains of southwestern Hebei province, China, located less than  from the border with Shanxi and  south-southwest of the county seat. , it has 19 villages under its administration.

See also
List of township-level divisions of Hebei

References

Township-level divisions of Hebei